The 1994 Bath City Council election was held on Thursday 5 May 1994 to elect councillors to Bath City Council in England. It took place on the same day as other district council elections in the United Kingdom. One third of seats were up for election. Two seats were contested in Lambridge and Lansdown due to extra vacancies occurring.

These were the final elections of the city council, before its abolition on 1 April 1996 when it was merged with Wansdyke District Council to form Bath and North East Somerset Council.

The 1994 election saw the Liberal Democrats take a majority of seats on the Council for the first time, winning 17 of the 18 seats up for election.

Results summary

Ward results
Sitting councillors seeking re-election, elected in 1990, are marked with an asterisk (*). The ward results listed below are based on the changes from the 1992 elections, not taking into account any party defections or by-elections.

Abbey

Bathwick

Bloomfield

Combe Down

Kingsmead

Lambridge

Lansdown

Lyncombe

Newbridge

Oldfield

Southdown

Twerton

Walcot

Westmoreland

Weston

Widcombe

References

1994 English local elections
1994
1990s in Somerset